Marseille soap  or Savon de Marseille is a traditional hard soap made from vegetable oils that has been produced around Marseille, France, for about 600 years.  The first documented soapmaker was recorded there in about 1370. By 1688, Louis XIV introduced regulations in the Edict of Colbert limiting the use of the name savon de Marseille to olive oil based soaps.  The law has since been amended to allow other vegetable oils to be used.

By 1913, production had reached 180,000 tons. Thus, in 1924, there were 132 soapmaking companies in the Marseille and Salon-de-Provence areas combined. However, by 2000, there were only five remaining.

Production

Traditionally, the soap is made by mixing sea water from the Mediterranean Sea, olive oil, and the alkaline ash from sea plants together in a large cauldron (usually making about 8 tons). This mixture is then heated for several days while being stirred continuously. The mixture is allowed to sit until ready and is then poured into a mold and allowed to set slightly. While still soft it is cut into bars, stamped, and left to completely harden. The whole process can take up to a month.

Today
Today there are two main types of Marseille soap, a greenish-hued variety made with added colour and a white one made of olive oil, or a palm and coconut oil mixture. Originally sold only in 5 kg and 20 kg blocks, today they come in sizes between 300 g and 1 kg, though larger sizes are often available, some up to 40 kg.

Marseille soap is frequently used for domestic cleaning, including hand-washing of delicate garments such as those made of wool or silk. In its liquid form it is commonly sold as a hand soap. It can also be used in agriculture as a pesticide.

See also
Aleppo soap
Azul e branco soap
Castile soap
Hot process
Moroccan black soap
Nabulsi soap

References

Soaps
Culture of Marseille